Belgium competed at the 1932 Winter Olympics in Lake Placid, United States.

Bobsleigh

Figure skating

Women

References

 Olympic Winter Games 1932, full results by sports-reference.com

Nations at the 1932 Winter Olympics
1932
Olympics, Winter